Hải An is an urban district (quận) of Hai Phong, the third largest city of Vietnam.

Economy
Hải An is the headquarters of Z189, one of Vietnam's largest shipyards.

References

Districts of Haiphong